Sar Cheshmeh is a village in Aliabad Rural District, in the Central District of Taft County, Yazd Province, Iran. At the 2006 census, its population was 96, in 30 families.

References 

Populated places in Taft County